Un poquito tuyo is a Mexican telenovela produced by Imagen Televisión. It stars Marjorie de Sousa and Jorge Salinas. It is an adaptation of the Chilean telenovela titled Tranquilo papá created by Rodrigo Bastidas. Production began on 31 October 2018 and concluded in March 2019. It premiered on 25 February 2019 and ended on 17 June 2019.

Plot 
Antonio Solano is an extremely successful family father who comes from a humble family, so he strives to give his family everything he could not have in his youth. In his eagerness that his family does not lack anything, Antonio is generous to the point of spoiling his wife and children; as a result the three kids, Eduardo, Javier, and Viviana become good-for-nothing spoiled brats, doing nothing but spend the money in superficial things, while his wife Catalina only worries about staying beautiful with surgeries. To top, his own sister Leticia and her husband as well as Catalina's mother are on-and-off moochers of his wealth as well.

On the day of his birthday, Antonio realizes what he has caused when none of his loved ones remembers to congratulate him, and to top it off they only appear to ask for more and more. That's when Antonio finally snaps and decides to put a limit: from now on each of them will have to work to earn a living. His life falls apart with the arrival of Julieta, whom he almost hits with his car as she was running away from her wedding once she discovered the truth about her groom. Julieta becomes a person from whom he will not be able to separate.

Cast 
 Jorge Salinas as Antonio Solano
 Marjorie de Sousa as Julieta Vargas
 Lorena Herrera as Catalina Montiel
 Raúl Coronado as Elvis Ramón Rosales
 Thali García as Viviana Solano
 Alexa Martín as Madonna Rosales
 Daniel Tovar as Elton Rosales
 María José Magán as Elena Vargas
 David Palacio as Eduardo Solano
 David Caro Levy as Javier Solano
 Eugenio Montessoro as Francisco "Paco" Vargas
 Nubia Martí as Lupita
 Ariane Pellicer as Gregoria
 Christian de la Campa as Álvaro
 Carlos Athié as Mateo
 Eva Cedeño as Leticia "Lety" Solano
 Andrea Carreiro as Violeta
 Camila Rojas as Azucena
 Josh Gutiérrez as Beto
 Sergio Rogalto as Johnny Green
 Carlos Speitzer as Fonsi
 Solkin Ruz as Wisin
 Silvana Garriga as Rebeca
 Lucas Bernabé as Fabián
 Adriana Montes de Oca as Mileidy
 Daya Burgos as Sara Escobar
 Erick Velarde as Adrián Jiménez
 Edmundo Velarde as Iván Jiménez

Ratings 
   
}}

Episodes

References

External links 
 

2019 Mexican television series debuts
2019 Mexican television series endings
2019 telenovelas
Mexican telenovelas
Imagen Televisión telenovelas
Spanish-language telenovelas